Ceasar C. Mitchell (born 1968), is an American politician and attorney who served as President of Atlanta City Council from 2010 to 2018. He was an unsuccessful candidate in the 2017 Atlanta mayoral election.

Early life and education 
Mitchell is a native of Atlanta, Georgia. His father was an Atlanta Police Department officer and his mother taught in the Atlanta Public Schools. Mitchell graduated from Benjamin Elijah Mays High School. He earned a Bachelor of Arts degree from Morehouse College, where he double-majored in English and economics. He then earned a Juris Doctor from the University of Georgia School of Law.

Career 
Prior to his election as president of the Atlanta City Council, Mitchell was a council member for eight years. Mitchell is a partner at the Dentons law firm, where he specializes in public policy and local government.

After the death of incumbent Congressman John Lewis, Mitchell was mentioned as a possible candidate to replace Lewis on the November general election ballot.

Personal life 
Mitchell and his wife, Tiffany, have two daughters and a son. Mitchell's wife is a public school teacher. They live in West End, Atlanta.

References

External links
 https://www.wsbtv.com/news/politics/1-week-until-election-voters-to-decide-on-atlanta-mayor-other-crucial-races/634757937
 https://www.dentons.com/en/ceasar-mitchell

1968 births
Living people
Atlanta City Council members
Georgia (U.S. state) Democrats
Henry Crown Fellows
Morehouse College alumni
University of Georgia School of Law alumni
African-American city council members in Georgia (U.S. state)
21st-century African-American people
20th-century African-American people